North Rhine-Westphalia is one of the sixteen states of Germany.

NRW may also refer to:

Organisations
 Natural Resources Wales, a Welsh regulatory body
 NLEX Road Warriors, a Philippine basketball team

 NRW Holdings, an Australian construction and mining contractor

Other uses
 National Reconciliation Week, celebrations of Australia's indigenous history and culture
 Nicolson–Ross–Weir method, a method for measuring material properties for microwaves
 Non-revenue water, leakage of water supply 
 Norwich railway station, England (by GB station code)
 .nrw, a Nikon RAW file format

See also
 NRW Forum
 NRW Invest 
 NRW Trophy 
 Kunstsammlung NRW
 Kunststiftung NRW